Monaam Elabed is a Tunisian Paralympian track and field athlete.

He was the first Tunisian to participate in a Paralympic Games, when in 1988, he won two bronze medals in 400m C6 and 3000m cross country C6 event.  He also competed in the 100 and 200m events.

See also
 Tunisia at the Paralympics
 Athletics at the 1988 Summer Paralympics

References

Paralympic athletes of Tunisia
Living people
Medalists at the 1988 Summer Paralympics
Paralympic bronze medalists for Tunisia
Athletes (track and field) at the 1988 Summer Paralympics
Tunisian male middle-distance runners
Year of birth missing (living people)
Paralympic medalists in athletics (track and field)
20th-century Tunisian people